This is a list of the longest-running U.S. broadcast network television series, ordered by the number of broadcast seasons.

To qualify for this list, the programming must originate in North America, be shown on a United States national (not regional) television network, and be first-run (as opposed to a repackaging of previously aired material or material released in other media). For this list, series that were available only on a local or regional basis are excluded. The "number of seasons" total does not include cable broadcasts or series in syndication.

Over 60 years

50–59 years

40–49 years

30–39 years

20–29 years

See also 
 List of longest-running United States television series
 List of longest-running U.S. cable television series
 List of longest-running U.S. primetime television series
 List of longest-running U.S. first-run syndicated television series
 List of longest-running television shows by category
 List of longest-running Philippine television series
 List of longest-running UK television series
 List of longest-running Australian television series
 List of television series canceled after one episode
 List of television series canceled before airing an episode

Notes

References 

Longest running broadcast
Broadcast network
US broadcast